Dolni Chiflik Municipality is a municipality (obshtina) in Varna Province, Northeastern Bulgaria. It is named after its administrative centre - the town of Dolni Chiflik.

The municipality spreads from Dalgopol Municipality in the west to the Bulgarian Black Sea Coast in the east. To the north the area is mostly defined by the Kamchiya river and its estuary.

Settlements 

Dolni Chiflik Municipality includes the following 17 places (towns are shown in bold):

Demography 
The population of Dolni Chiflik Municipality is 20,217, of which 12,857 Bulgarians, 5,390 Turks and 717 Roma.

The following table shows the change of the population during the last four decades.

Religion 
According to the latest Bulgarian census of 2011, the religious composition, among those who answered the optional question on religious identification, was the following:

A  majority of the population of Dolni Chiflik Municipality identify themselves as Christians. At the 2011 census, 66.8% of respondents identified as Orthodox Christians belonging to the Bulgarian Orthodox Church. Muslims constitute the second largest religious group with 15.1% of the population.

See also
Provinces of Bulgaria
Municipalities of Bulgaria
List of cities and towns in Bulgaria

References

External links
 Official website 

Municipalities in Varna Province